These are the official results of the Women's Discus Throw event at the 1997 IAAF World Championships in Athens, Greece. There were a total number of 29 participating athletes, with two qualifying groups and the final held on Thursday August 7, 1997. The qualifying round was held on Tuesday August 5, 1997, with the mark set at 62.00 metres.

Medalists

Schedule
All times are Eastern European Time (UTC+2)

Abbreviations
All results shown are in metres

Qualification

Group A

Group B

Final

See also
 1996 Women's Olympic Discus Throw

References
 Results

D
Discus throw at the World Athletics Championships
1997 in women's athletics